Xiuhu Station, is a station on Line 2 of Wuhan Metro. It entered revenue service on February 19, 2019. It is located in Jiangxia District.

Station layout

References

Wuhan Metro stations
Line 2, Wuhan Metro
Railway stations in China opened in 2019